Fielding or Feilding is a surname of Anglo-Saxon English origin. It is derived from the old English Felden. The Feildings of Denbigh claimed descent from the Habsburg dynasty through the count of Laufenburg-Rinfelden. Generally, the surname originates from the Midlands, particularly in the county of Warwickshire.

People with the surname 
Business, commerce, science, technology, and professional trades
Amanda Feilding (born 1943), British artist, scientist and drug policy reformer
Fred F. Fielding (born 1939), American lawyer
Henry Barron Fielding (1805–1851), English botanist
Roy Fielding (born 1965), American computer scientist, one of the principal authors of the HTTP specification
Thomas Fielding (born abt 1758), English engraver
Sir Charles William Fielding (1863–1941), British businessman, landowner, farmer, writer, and civil servant

English nobility
Alexander Feilding, 12th Earl of Denbigh (born 1970)

Fine arts
Copley Fielding (1787–1855), English painter
Noel Fielding (born 1973), English artist, comedian and actor
Mantle Fielding (1865–1941), American architect, art and engraver historian, and tennis player

Military
Charles Fielding or Feilding (1738–1783), British naval officer
Xan Fielding (1918–1991), British soldier, author, translator, journalist and traveller

Public servants
Sir John Fielding (1721–1780), English magistrate and social reformer
Sir Leslie Fielding (born 1932), British former ambassador
Steve Fielding (born 1960), Australian senator

Religion
Joseph Fielding (1797–1863), English leader of the Latter-day Saint movement

Sports
Frank Fielding (born 1988), English football goalkeeper
Fred Fielding (footballer) (1889–1918), Australian rules footballer
Keith Fielding (born 1949), English rugby footballer
Ross Fielding (1880–1947), English footballer
William Fielding (architect) (1875–1946), New Zealand architect and lawn bowler

Writers, performing artists, and musicians
Daphne Fielding (1904–1997), British author
Emma Fielding (born 1966), English actress
Fenella Fielding (1927–2018), English actress
Harold Fielding (1916-2003), English theatre producer
Helen Fielding (born 1958), English novelist and screenwriter, author of Bridget Jones's Diary
Henry Fielding (1707–1754), English novelist and dramatist, author of Tom Jones
Janet Fielding (born 1953), Australian actress
Joy Fielding (born 1945), Canadian novelist and actress
Marjorie Fielding (1892–1956), British stage and film actress
Michael Fielding (born 1982), English comedian and actor
Sarah Fielding (1710–1768), English novelist
Susannah Fielding (born 1985), English actress
Jerry Fielding (1922–1980), American composer, conductor, and musical director
William John Fielding (1886–1973), American writer
Yvette Fielding (born 1968), English broadcaster, producer and actress
Zaachariaha Fielding, one half of Australian electronic music duo Electric Fields

Other
William Feilding (disambiguation)

In fiction
Caroline Fairchild (née Fielding), leading character in Executive Stress
Matt Fielding, fictional character in American television series Melrose Place

See also
R. Fielding Dodd (c.1890–1958), Scottish architect

References

English-language surnames